Laura Kluge (born 6 November 1996) is a German ice hockey player for the St. Cloud State Huskies and the German national team.

She participated at the 2015 IIHF Women's World Championship.

References

External links

1996 births
Living people
Ice hockey people from Berlin
German women's ice hockey forwards
German expatriate ice hockey people
German expatriate sportspeople in Sweden
German expatriate sportspeople in the United States
Linköping HC Dam players
St. Cloud State Huskies women's ice hockey players